The GM Technical Center is a General Motors facility in Warren, Michigan. The campus has been the center of the company's engineering effort since its inauguration in 1956. In 2000 it was listed on the National Register of Historic Places; fourteen years later it was designated a National Historic Landmark, primarily for its architecture.

History
The "Tech Center" was designed by architect Eero Saarinen, with construction beginning in 1949. The original campus was completed in 1955 and ceremonially opened by President Dwight D. Eisenhower on May 16, 1956. The facility cost the company approximately US$100 million at the time.

In the following decades, the number of buildings at the Tech Center increased with the massive Vehicle Engineering Center (VEC), several wind tunnels, a battery development area, and most recently a pre-production operations (PPO) building. This growth was spurred by increasing amounts of technology in vehicles and by General Motors continuing centralization of engineering.

Description
The "Tech Center" is a 710-acre campus located in Warren, Michigan. The center includes 38 buildings and can house over 21,000
employees. The campus is bounded by Van Dyke Avenue on the east, by Mound Road on the west, by Chicago Road on the north, and by 12 Mile Road on the south. The Tech Center is divided by a north-south railroad right-of-way:  the western half includes research, design, and advanced engineering activities while the eastern half includes more planning, current engineering, pre-production, and service activities.

The site offers an advanced technology business atmosphere emphasizing flexibility, efficiency, innovation, quality, safety, and security. The lakes are used as emergency fire reservoirs in the event of a catastrophic fire. Fire safety has been a priority at GM since the historic industrial fire occurred in 1953 at the GM Hydramatic plant in Livonia, Michigan.

West Area
 Research & Development
 The Metallurgy Building
 The Administration Building and exhibition hall
 Design Center
 The Lake
 Sloan Engineering Buildings (North, Central, and South)
 The Central Cafeteria
 Manufacturing Centers
 Manufacturing A Building
 Manufacturing B Building
 Wind Tunnels
 Aero Lab
 Climatic Wind Tunnel

East Area
 Cadillac Headquarters
 CCO Building (formerly Chevrolet Headquarters)
 Vehicle Engineering Center (VEC)
 Advanced Engineering Center (formerly Powertrain Engineering)
 Pre-production Operations (PPO)
 Training Center
 Service Engineering Center
 After-sales Engineering

Architectural significance

The Tech Center was the first major independent project of Eero Saarinen after leaving his father's firm, and proved to be foundational to his later success.  The architectural style and collaborative methods of development he practiced were used in his successful applications in other large-scale corporate campus environment for clients including Bell Labs, IBM, and the John Deere World Headquarters.  His design for the Tech Center received architectural accolades beginning in 1956, when it was hailed as "one of the great 20th Century compositions born out of the sense of civic responsibility of a great corporation" by Max Abramovitz, and it was described as an "Industrial Versailles" by Architectural Forum.  Its architectural importance was cited as the primary reason for the center's 2014 National Historic Landmark designation.  The American Institute of Architects honored it in 1986 as the most outstanding architectural project of its era.

See also
List of National Historic Landmarks in Michigan
National Register of Historic Places listings in Macomb County, Michigan
Canadian Technical Centre

Notes

Further reading

External links

Eero Saarinen structures
National Historic Landmarks in Michigan
National Register of Historic Places in Macomb County, Michigan
Buildings and structures in Macomb County, Michigan
Technical Center
Industrial buildings and structures on the National Register of Historic Places in Michigan
Industrial buildings completed in 1955
Warren, Michigan
1956 establishments in Michigan